Zeitschrift für Naturforschung A is a monthly peer-reviewed scientific journal. The journal covers "all areas of physical sciences including mathematical physics, physical chemistry, cosmophysics and geophysics" in both English and German. According to the Journal Citation Reports, the journal has a 2015 impact factor of 0.886. The editor-in-chief is Martin Holthaus (Carl von Ossietzky Universität).

History 

The Zeitschrift für Naturforschung (English: Journal for Nature Research) was established in 1946 by the Max Planck Institute and the physical sciences papers (Part A) were separated from the other natural sciences (Part B) in 1947. Over the years, the titles used for Part A have been:

 Zeitschrift für Naturforschung. A, Astrophysik, Physik und physikalische Chemie. (1947–1971)
 Zeitschrift für Naturforschung. Teil A, Physik, physikalische Chemie, Kosmophysik. (1972–1987)
 Zeitschrift für Naturforschung. A, A Journal of Physical Sciences. (1987–present)

References

External links
 

Physics journals
Monthly journals
Publications established in 1947
Multilingual journals
De Gruyter academic journals